Ernest Archibald Maynard "Peter" Wright (24 February 1908 – 13 September 1985) was an Australian mining entrepreneur. He was best known as the business partner of Lang Hancock. After his death, his estate became worth over 1 billion.

Early life and education
Wright was born in Kalgoorlie to parents who were originally from Victoria. The family moved to Perth at a young age and Wright was educated at several schools, including Hale School. He left school before graduating.

In 1932 he married Pauline McClemans, daughter of William McClemans, an Anglican clergyman who founded Christ Church Grammar School.

Business career
After leaving school, he joined the Bank of New South Wales. In 1930 he qualified as an accountant and set up his own accountancy firm. In 1938 he became general manager of his father's firm F. W. Wright & Co, later becoming managing director when it became Wright Ltd in 1949.

During the late 1930s, Wright joined with former schoolmate Lang Hancock in a mining venture in the north-west of Western Australia, beginning a partnership that lasted for several decades. One of their early ventures was an asbestos mine at Wittenoom, Western Australia.

In 1969 Wright and his partner Lang Hancock commenced publication in Perth of a weekly newspaper The Sunday Independent principally to help further their mining interests. Hancock largely relinquishing his interest in it in the early 70s but Wright continued publishing it until selling it to The Truth in 1984.

Death and legacy
Wright died in 1985 in Bangkok, Thailand while travelling home to Perth from Europe. He was cremated at Karrakatta Cemetery.

In 1985 the Business Review Weekly (BRW) estimated his net worth at 50 million. By 2013, the magazine valued his family's net worth at 1.53 billion. The rise in the value was largely a result of royalty agreements signed by Hancock and Wright during the 1960s. The agreements entitled Hancock and Wright 2.5 percent of revenue generated by Rio Tinto's Hamersley Iron mines.

References

1908 births
1985 deaths
Australian mining entrepreneurs
People from Kalgoorlie
Australian accountants
Australian newspaper founders
People educated at Hale School
People from Perth, Western Australia